Ivica Dačić — Prime Minister of Serbia was the name of a political coalition led by the Socialist Party of Serbia that took part in the 2022 Serbian general election. 

Alongside the Socialist Party of Serbia, the coalition is also composed of the United Serbia and Greens of Serbia. Its former members include the Party of United Pensioners of Serbia and the Communist Party. The SPS-led coalition has been a part of the Serbian government since 2008, first as a member of the coalition government with the Democratic Party, and since 2012, with the SNS-led coalition.

Members 
The following table includes political parties that participated on the "Ivica Dačić — Prime Minister of Serbia" ballot list in the 2022 parliamentary election.

Former members

Electoral performance

Parliamentary elections

References

2008 establishments in Serbia
Political parties established in 2008
Political party alliances in Serbia
Parliamentary groups